Paul Sun (8 June 1937 – 21 January 2018) was a Taiwanese politician.

Career
Born on 8 June 1937 in Tainan, Sun received a bachelor's degree from National Taiwan University, and subsequently earned a master's degree and doctorate from the University of Minnesota and Purdue, respectively.

He became active in Taiwan's conservation movement shortly thereafter. In 1992, while serving the Taiwan Provincial Government as head of the Department of Agriculture and Forestry, Sun founded the Taiwan Endemic Species Research Institute. In November of that year, Sun was appointed agriculture minister and retained his position under premier Lien Chan. In June 1996, Sun was succeeded by Tjiu Mau-ying.

After stepping down, Sun continued to work with the Council of Agriculture as an ambassador at large and frequently traveled to the United States to promote agricultural cooperation. Sun joined the China-based Taiwan Agricultural Entrepreneurship Garden in September 2009, while chairman of the World Vegetable Center in Taiwan. Several legislators believed this to be a conflict of interest. Additionally, Sun led the 21st Century Foundation. On 21 January 2018, Sun died of pancreatic cancer, aged 80.

References

1937 births
2018 deaths
National Taiwan University alumni
University of Minnesota alumni
Purdue University alumni
Taiwanese Ministers of Agriculture
Politicians of the Republic of China on Taiwan from Tainan
Deaths from cancer in Taiwan
Nature conservation in Taiwan
Deaths from pancreatic cancer